Conus moncuri is a species of sea snail, a marine gastropod mollusk in the family Conidae, the cone snails, cone shells or cones.

These snails are predatory and venomous. They are capable of "stinging" humans.

Description
The size of the shell varies between 98 mm and 181 mm.

Distribution
This marine species occurs off the Philippines and Papua New Guinea.

References

 Filmer R.M. 2005. A New Conus species from the Philippines (Gastropoda - Conidae). Of Sea & Shore, 27(1): 58-63 
 Puillandre N., Duda T.F., Meyer C., Olivera B.M. & Bouchet P. (2015). One, four or 100 genera? A new classification of the cone snails. Journal of Molluscan Studies. 81: 1-23

External links
 World Register of Marine Species
 Cone Shells - Knights of the Sea
 Gastropods.com:  Strategoconus litteratus var. moncuri 

moncuri
Gastropods described in 2005